Ashwicken is a small village and former civil parish, now in the parish of Leziate, in the King's Lynn and West Norfolk district, in the county of Norfolk, England.<ref>OS Explorer Map 23” – Norfolk Coast West, King's Lynn & Hunstanton. </ref> The village sits on the B1145 King's Lynn to Mundesley road around  east of King's Lynn. In 1931 the parish had a population of 117. On 1 April 1935 the parish was abolished and merged with Leziate.

The village name means 'At the specialised-farm', with the later addition of 'ash-tree' or a personal name.

Ashwicken is the site of a shrunken medieval village, one of around 200 lost settlements in Norfolk.Shrunken medieval village of Ashwicken, Norfolk Heritage Explorer. Retrieved 2015-11-15. The remains of the village were visible as earthworks near to Ashwicken Hall but were partly destroyed by ploughing in the 1990s. The hall was surrounded by a medieval moat which was filled in during the 19th century.

The parish church, which is dedicated to All Saints, dates from the medieval period. It was restored during the 19th century and is a Grade II* listed building.Church of All Saints, Leziate, British Listed Buildings. Retrieved 2016-11-09.

War Memorial

The War Memorials for Ashwicken, Bawsey and Leziate are located in All Saint's Church, Ashwicken. It holds the following names for the First World War:
 Rifleman William Watson (d.1917), 11th Battalion, Rifle Brigade (The Prince Consort's Own)
 Private Robert J. Britton (1888-1916), 6th Battalion, Border Regiment
 Private Maurice G. Allison (d.1916), 1st (North Midland) Battery, Royal Garrison Artillery
 Private Thomas H. Reed (d.1916), 1st Battalion, Royal Norfolk Regiment
 Private Bertie E. Beales (1896-1918), 5th Battalion, Royal Norfolk Regiment
 Private William Newell (d.1917), 5th Battalion, Royal Norfolk Regiment
 Private Walter Law (1893-1918), 7th Battalion, Royal Norfolk Regiment
 Private Herbert Watson (d.1918), 9th Battalion, Royal Norfolk Regiment
 Private George Wilkin (d.1916), 9th Battalion, Royal Norfolk Regiment
And, the following names for the Second World War:
 Able-Seaman Raymond C. Powley (1922-1941), HMS Nile''

References

External links

Villages in Norfolk
Former civil parishes in Norfolk
King's Lynn and West Norfolk